Thomas Snow is a pianist, bandleader, composer, and educator from New England.

Biography
Tom Snow is a graduate from the New England Conservatory of Music (M.M. 2005) and the Berklee College of Music (B.M. 1991). Tom has studied improvisation and piano with Danilo Pérez, Michael Cain, and Jerry Bergonzi.

Tom has played with many jazz musicians including Dave Holland, Ken Peplowski, Greg Abate, Bruce Gertz, Larry Coryell, Nick Brignola, Phil Wilson, Mike Turk, Gray Sargent, John Lockwood, Dick Johnson, Herb Pomeroy, and Les DeMerle.

His career has included both traveling throughout Australia and the United States with Irish tenor John McNally and long-term engagements at the Ritz-Carlton Resort in Amelia Island, Florida, The Balsams Grand Resort Hotel, Royal Caribbean Cruise Lines, and the Mount Washington Hotel.

Tom Snow is also on faculty at Bates College and lives in Westbrook, Maine with his wife and two sons.

Discography
Solo albums
 Friends
 Christmas at Mast Cove
 Some Other Time
 Northern Standard Time (1997)

As leader
 2001 Mast Cove Galleries (MCG 100201)
 1997 Invisible Music (IM2003)

As session pianist:
 Listening Post: The Ludington van Voorst Quartet, 2004
 Engine One, Ladder Twenty Four
 Dave Packard and Friends, 2002
 The Dream's On Me Carol Jackson, 2001
 Dames Rocket Kate Schrock, 2000 Kakelane 0400
 CD Sampler Vol. 1 Jim Jose, 1999 Wrench Records, WR 108
 Blues On My Back Troy Truner, 1999 Telarc, CD 83448
 Amphora Mark Kleinhaut, 1999 Invisible Music, IM 2005
 Scheme A Dream Every Sunday, 1998 Spaboop Music
 Feel The Love Motor Booty Affair, 1997
 Vegas Wig Publishing
 Jazzin' Maine Christmas 1995 Invisible Music
 Tracy Maclean and Friends Live at Crickets 1995 Malarkey Music

External links
 Tom Snow's homepage; includes upcoming performances, reviews, booking/contact information, and testimonials

American male composers
21st-century American composers
American bandleaders
Bates College faculty
American music educators
Living people
Year of birth missing (living people)
New England Conservatory alumni
Berklee College of Music alumni
American male pianists
21st-century American pianists
21st-century American male musicians